The 2016 Can-Am Duels were a pair of NASCAR Sprint Cup Series stock car races held on February 18, 2016, at Daytona International Speedway in Daytona Beach, Florida. Both contested over 60 laps, they were the qualifying races for the 2016 Daytona 500. Dale Earnhardt Jr. won the first Duel race and Kyle Busch won the second Duel race.

Report

Background

Daytona International Speedway is one of six superspeedways to hold NASCAR races, the others being Michigan International Speedway, Auto Club Speedway, Indianapolis Motor Speedway, Pocono Raceway and Talladega Superspeedway. The track's turns are banked at 31 degrees, while the front stretch, the location of the finish line, is banked at 18 degrees.

Practice

First practice (February 13)

Second practice (February 13)

Pole qualifying

Qualifying for the Daytona 500 is different from any other race weekend because the starting lineup for the race – except for the two drivers that post the two fastest timed laps in the final round of qualifying – isn't set on qualifying day. It sets the lineup for the two duel races the following Thursday.

Unlike qualifying at non-restrictor plate races, qualifying at Daytona International Speedway and Talladega Superspeedway consists of two rounds of cars being sent out one at a time to make a single timed lap. The fastest 12 advance to the final round to run for the pole position.

He said that today was "a very, very cool day. I don’t know that this opportunity has sunk in yet, much less sitting on the pole for the Daytona 500. I think the big thing is just the team and the Daytona 500 qualifying is about the team guys and the effort they put into these cars and it’s nothing special I did, it’s really what kind of work they did this off-season to make it happen."

After qualifying seventh and being all but guaranteed into the Daytona 500 based on speed, Ryan Blaney said that he "wasn't really too nervous going into today. I knew we had a really fast race car. We just had to do our job and we did it and we just had to lock ourselves in. I really wasn't feeling any different than I do any other day."

Likewise, Matt DiBenedetto – who is also all but guaranteed in on his speed after qualifying 24th – said that he could "sleep well, finally. I was really nervous all night. This is just a testament to the hard work from the guys on my team. Two-hundredths of a second. I'm really thankful, thankful to be racing in my first Daytona 500, most importantly. I'm really thankful and blessed to be here.”

Martin Truex Jr. was unable to post a time over a roof flap issue. The Stewart Haas Racing cars of Kevin Harvick and Brian Vickers had their times disqualified after their track bars failed inspection.

Qualifying results

Practice (post-qualifying)

Third practice (February 17)

Fourth practice (February 17)
Kyle Larson and Michael Waltrip will start from the rear of the field in their respective Duel races after being involved in a four-car crash in turn 1.

Final practice (February 18)

Races

Race 1

First half

Start
Under clear night Florida skies, Chase Elliott led the field to the green flag at 7:21 p.m. He drafted ahead of teammate Dale Earnhardt Jr. to lead the first lap. After stalling out heading to the line, Earnhardt took the lead on lap 3. He spent the next few laps holding the reins of the field controlling the top and bottom lanes. Eventually the field formed a single-file line and rode around the top lane of the track. Brad Keselowski made a few attempts to pass him, but Earnhardt continued to control the track to the point he settled back behind. By lap 27, the single-file train broke up and two lines formed amongst the front pack. A number of cars hit pit road to kick off a cycle of green flag stops on lap 40. Earnhardt hit pit road on lap 41 and teammate Kasey Kahne assumed the lead. He pitted the next lap and the lead cycled to Denny Hamlin.

Second half
The first caution of the race flew on lap 43 for a single-car spin in turn 1. Going for the pass on Michael McDowell, Cole Whitt got turned and sent spinning by Regan Smith. He retired from the race and would go on to miss the Daytona 500.

The race restarted with 13 laps to go. Hamlin got a jump on Earnhardt and pulled to the front with ease. Earnhardt worked his way back to the front and drove underneath Hamlin to retake the lead with five laps to go. As Brian Scott got turned and slammed the inside wall exiting turn 4, Earnhardt took the checkered flag. McDowell raced his way in as the fastest of the non-charter cars while Cole Whitt and Josh Wise did not qualify.

Results

Race 2

First half

Start
Matt Kenseth led the field to the green flag at 9:02 p.m. He pulled ahead of teammate Kyle Busch to lead the first lap. Unlike the first Duel race, the bottom line disappeared and the field formed a single-file train by the fifth lap. After Ryan Newman led the second pack of cars back up to the lead 11 cars, Martin Truex Jr. jumped in front of him and reformed the bottom line. However, the line lost momentum and merged with the top line. Running with debris on his grille, Kenseth let Busch go by him in turn 1 to get it off and Busch took over the lead on lap 25. Kyle Busch hit pit road on lap 39 and handed the lead to Aric Almirola. He pitted the next lap and the lead cycled back to Busch.

Second half

With six laps to go, Jimmie Johnson broke out of line and caused the single-file line to form multiple lines before reforming into a single line. Eventually, Kenseth tried to break the line up again, but the field remained in place. With two laps to go, Casey Mears ran out of gas, nearly caused a wreck amongst the leaders and broke up the single-file train. The final lap saw a multi-car wreck in turn 1 that ended the race and gave the win to Busch. Robert Richardson Jr. raced his way in, while David Gilliland and Reed Sorenson failed to qualify.

Results

Media

Television

Radio

Notes

References

2016 NASCAR Sprint Cup Series
2016 in sports in Florida
NASCAR races at Daytona International Speedway
February 2016 sports events in the United States